The Toqi Telpak Furushon is a bazaar located in Bukhara, which forms part of its historic centre.

Location 
Toqi Telpak Furushon is located about 300 meters south of Toqi Zargaron, at a point where five streets meet. About 10 meters to the west and south is the Magok-i-Kurpa Mosque.

History
The Toqi Telpak Furushon was built between 1570 and 1571. Books were originally offered there, which is why the bazaar was also called Toqi Kitob. Gradually, the bookstalls were replaced by workshops and shops of the hat sellers. Turbans, fur hats and small caps embroidered with gold and silk thread or glass beads were made there and offered for sale. Although these goods can still be found there, carpets, jewellery, knives, musical instruments and other travel souvenirs are also sold.

References

Bazaars
Buildings and structures in Bukhara
Buildings and structures completed in 1571
1571 establishments in Asia